Polsloe Bridge railway station  is a suburban railway station in Exeter, Devon, England. The station serves the Polsloe, Mount Pleasant, Hamlin and Whipton areas of the city.

History
The station was opened in 1907 to serve the eastern suburbs of Exeter.  It was situated just a short distance along the branch to Exmouth and was convenient for Exmouth Junction engine shed which was on the opposite side of the main line.

The platforms were rebuilt in 1927 using concrete components cast at the concrete workshop that had been established at Exmouth Junction.  On 4 February 1973 the branch was singled and the down platform taken out of use.

Private goods sidings were provided on the west side of the line on both sides of the station.  Between the platform and the junction was a siding to a brickworks, while a little to the south was Newcourt, a military depot.

Description and facilities 
The station has one platform currently in use – on the right of trains arriving from Exeter – situated on an embankment above Pinhoe Road. The only access to the station is via a number of steps. The former second platform and its stairwell to street level remains opposite the platform in use, albeit very overgrown and derelict.

There is no ticket machine. It has no disabled access or restroom facilities on the platform. There is a small car park which can fit a handful of cars.

Services

References

External Links

Railway stations in Exeter
Former London and South Western Railway stations
Railway stations in Great Britain opened in 1907
Railway stations served by Great Western Railway
DfT Category F2 stations